

History
London-based Y2K FM (standing for 'Yours 2 Keep') began broadcasting in early 2000 on the 90.6 frequency modulation which was formerly occupied by Pulse FM (Jungle music), Chicago FM (House & Garage), Cyndicut FM (Drum & Bass) and its predecessor Mission FM. Transmitting from north London as a pirate radio station to inner London city and the Greater London area. They won joint first place for "The Best Radio Station" with Freek FM, in the UK Garage Awards 2000, at Camden Palace.

During their years of broadcast they played UK Garage music, but also showcased influential DJs, MCs and performers from the UK Hip Hop, Dancehall, and Jungle Drum & Bass scenes. They played a spectrum of UK underground music, dedicating Monday nights as a platform for the Jungle Drum & Bass scene calling it 'Manic Mondays' and the dedicating Thursdays to UK Hip Hop and R&B. Their main choice of specialism was UK Garage music. It was also the spiritual home of the Heartless Crew who played regular shows on there for several years along with the likes of DJ Naughty, Scotti Dee, DJ Tiny, LJ Influence, MC Skanker, DJ Steady, Donae'o, Super Raggo Crew, Outlaws, DJ Pioneer, and Bass Inject Crew.

References

Radio stations in London
Radio stations established in 2000
Radio stations disestablished in 2008
Pirate radio stations in the United Kingdom
Defunct radio stations in the United Kingdom